Lea Sirk (born 1 September 1989) is a Slovenian singer, who represented her country in the Eurovision Song Contest in 2018.

Biography
She started her musical education at the age of five in Koper, Slovenia. Between 2001 and 2007, Lea participated at numerous national and international competitions, where she regularly finished amongst the top positions. Lea finished her secondary school while studying the concert flute.

Lea studied at the Conservatory of Music in Geneva and has played in various orchestras and participated in different seminars across Europe. Lea Sirk completed her undergraduate studies early and with honours. She also finished her master studies with honours two years later and became a Master of Arts in Specialised Music Performance.

During her studies, Lea Sirk also established herself as a singer. In 2005, Lea received the award for the most promising young singer at the International Music Competition Cologne.

She began participating regularly at various festivals, as well as EMA, the Slovenian national selection for the Eurovision Song Contest (2009, 2010). Her participation in the show Znan obraz ima svoj glas (Your Face Sounds Familiar) left an indelible mark on viewers, as Lea was the most convincing through her transformations into famous world performers, including the 2017 Eurovision Song Contest winner, Salvador Sobral.

As a backing vocalist, Lea already performed already at the Eurovision Song Contest, namely in 2014 in Copenhagen with Tinkara Kovač. Lea is also a studio musician and music arranger and has performed on numerous grand stages and recorded with numerous Slovene musicians.

Lea, a mother of two girls, has been building her solo singing career in parallel with her other responsibilities. She won at EMA 2018 where she became the Slovene representative at the 2018 Eurovision Song Contest with her song "Hvala, ne!", which she wrote alongside Tomy DeClerque.

Discography

Albums

Singles

References

External links

1989 births
Eurovision Song Contest entrants of 2018
Living people
Musicians from Koper
Eurovision Song Contest entrants for Slovenia
21st-century Slovenian women singers
Slovenian pop singers